Thomas Mesnier (born 4 March 1986) is a French physician and politician of La République En Marche! (LREM) who has been serving as a member of the French National Assembly since the 2017 elections, representing the 1st constituency of the department of Charente.

Early life and education
Mesnier grew up in Juignac, Charente. During his medical studies at the University of Poitiers, he joined the National Association of Medical Students in France. In 2013, he became an emergency doctor at the Angoulême Hospital Center.

Political career
A member of En Marche! in the Charente, Mesnier was elected his party's candidate for the first constituency of Charente, in the parliamentary elections of 2017. He came first in the first round with 38% of the vote, far ahead of the candidate of La France Insoumise, Martine Boutin, and outgoing deputy Martine Pinville. On 18 June 2017, he was elected with 59.95% of the votes against Martine Boutin.

In the National Assembly, Mesnier serves on the Committee on Social Affairs. In this capacity, he was his parliamentary group's rapporteur on social security from 2019 to 2022.

In addition to his committee assignments, Mesnier is also a Vice-President of the French-British Parliamentary Friendship Group.

Also since November 2017, Mesnier has been part of LREM's executive board under the leadership of the party's successive chairmen Christophe Castaner and Stanislas Guerini.

He was re-elected in the 2022 election. On 2 December 2022, his election was annulled by the Constitutional Council.

See also
 2017 French legislative election
 2022 French legislative election

References

1986 births
Living people
Deputies of the 15th National Assembly of the French Fifth Republic
La République En Marche! politicians
Place of birth missing (living people)
Deputies of the 16th National Assembly of the French Fifth Republic